O'Neil Richards (born 7 December 1976 in Jamaica) is a Jamaican cricketer. He is a right-handed batsman and right-arm fast-medium bowler. He played five first-class and three List A matches for Jamaica between 1996 and 1999. He never represented the West Indies at senior international level, but did play for them at Under-19 level, and for Jamaica in the 1998 Commonwealth Games.

References
Cricket Archive player profile

1976 births
Living people
People from Saint Catherine Parish
Jamaican cricketers
Jamaica cricketers
Commonwealth Games competitors for Jamaica
Cricketers at the 1998 Commonwealth Games